Omaha Public Library is the public library system of the city of Omaha, Nebraska.  A library association was founded in 1857, but the library board was not appointed until 1877. In 1895, the library became one of the first six in the nation to create a children's section. There are 12 libraries in the system.

History
In 1857, the Omaha Library Association was formed, folding after three years. In 1872, a tiny library was opened on the second floor of the Simpson Carriage factory at 14th & Dodge Street. In 1877, the Omaha City Council appointed a library board, which levied a tax to create Omaha Public Library. They immediately accepted 4,500 books from the disbanded association as a gift.

Real estate tycoon Byron Reed donated land and his vast collection of coins, books and manuscripts to the library in the early 1890s, and in 1894, Omaha Public Library opened in its first permanent home at 18th and Harney. A year later, Omaha Public Library became one of the first six public libraries in the nation to create a separate children's section. A new central library called the W. Dale Clark Library opened at 14th and Farnam Streets in 1977 across from the Gene Leahy Mall.

Of the 12 libraries in the system, the W. Dale Clark Library houses the largest collection, including 7,000 genealogy books; 2,000 photos of the 1898 Trans-Mississippi International Exposition; a cuneiform collection; thousands of old postcards; and a rich collection of Omaha and Nebraska history resources.

Mildred L. Batchelder, Namesake of the American Library Association award given to the publisher of a translated children's book was formerly a librarian at an Omaha Library. One of her stated goals in her work, which was encouraging the translation of children's books from around the world, was "to eliminate barriers to understanding between people of different cultures, races, nations, and languages."

Governance
The Omaha Public Library is governed by a nine-member board of trustees. These people are appointed by the mayor of Omaha and confirmed by the Omaha City Council.  Terms are for three years. The Board of Trustees meet every third Thursday of each month at 5 PM at different branches throughout the system.  Meetings are open to the public and the agenda and minutes are posted on the Omaha Public Library website.

Branches

Notable Partnerships

The Henry Doorly Zoo and Aquarium 
In May 2017, the Omaha Public Library announced a partnership with the Henry Doorly Zoo and Aquarium. The zoo donated tickets to the library for the purpose of offering them free of charge to library members. A limited number of tickets are delivered to OPL branches for distribution four times a year. Each library branch then offers these one-time visit tickets to interested library members which allows them and three of their family members to visit the zoo for free.  Due to the Coronavirus Pandemic, the ticket distributions were suspended until further notice.

Fontenelle Forest 
In April 2018, the Omaha Public Library announced a partnership with Fontenelle Forest. Each of OPL's 12 branches would have 7 free forest admission passes available for check-out year-round. Passes are good for one-time admission on the day of the week designated on the pass, and each pass admits two adults and children from their household.

The Omaha Children's Museum 
In August 2018, the Omaha Public Library announced a partnership with the Omaha Children's Museum. Free children's museum tickets would be made available four times a year for distribution to library members. Each free one-time visit ticket is good for up to four family members. Due to the Coronavirus Pandemic, the ticket distributions were suspended until further notice.

The Lauritzen Gardens 
In December 2018,  the Omaha Public Library announced a partnership with Lauritzen Gardens. Free garden admission passes, 1 per branch location, would be made available to library members for checkout year-round. The passes are good for a one-time admission of two adults and any children from their household. After the pass is used the library member simply has to return it to any OPL branch location so it can be checked out by another library member.

The Durham Museum 
In January 2021, the Durham Museum announced a partnership with the Omaha Public Library. Free museum admission passes, 1 per branch location, would be made available to library members for checkout year-round. The passes are good for one-time admission of two adults and dependent children or grandchildren from their household. After the pass is used the library member simply has to return it to any OPL branch location so it can be checked out by another library member.

Heartland B-cycle 
The Omaha Public Library has a partnership with Heartland B-cycle. B-cycle provides passes for library members to rent bicycles for free through their bike sharing terminals. B-cycle passes are good for five days and allow OPL members who are 18 and up to check out a bike free of charge. Each OPL branch has four passes available for checkout.

Website and services

AskOPL 
If one has a question that one needs help answering the Omaha Public Library offers research and reference help through the ASKOPL service. Users can call, email, text, or use online chat to get help from an OPL librarian to answer their question.

Common Soil Seed Library 
In 2013, The Omaha Public Library created The Common Soil Seed Library to help encourage a culture of abundance and food literacy, promote urban agriculture, and help diversify open-pollinated plants and seed at the local level. The Common Soil Seed Library is a collection of open-pollinated and heirloom seeds that you can borrow to plant and grow at home. The seed collection depends on donations and seasonality.

Resource Center 
Over 100 online resources from eBooks, full-text journals, tutorials and databases are available to OPL members through the Omaha Public Library's  Resource Center website.

The Book Drop podcast 
The Book Drop is a weekly podcast produced by OPL staff that explores topics related to the Omaha community, libraries and the joy of reading. OPL staff offer reading suggestions, chat with guests and delve into books, resources and pop culture.

Book Clubs 
Omaha Public Library offers a variety of book club resources to help start a book club or find a book club to join. Omaha Public Library has hundreds of book club bags to choose from for adults, young adults and children. Each book club bag includes the following: canvas carrying bag, 7–12 copies of the book, and a notebook with discussion questions, author information and other materials.

The Well-Read Collective 
The Well-Read Collective is a team of Omaha Public Library staff members who love books and want to talk about what people are reading. The Well-Read Collective goal is to help the public find their next favorite read, explore new genres and talk about new and forthcoming titles. Members of the public can request a custom reading list, invite the collective to their next book club meeting or community event or connect with them at their local OPL branch.

Genealogy Reference Room 
The Genealogy Reference Room is located at the W. Dale Clark Main Library. The Genealogy Reference Room houses a non-circulating collection of more than 11,000 volumes including most standard genealogy reference works and a large collection of family genealogies organized by surname. Local materials are arranged by state and county. Family research enthusiasts will also find vital records indices, cemetery indices and transcriptions, census indices, county and town histories, and plat books, atlases, and gazetteers. The public can request help with local and genealogy research by filling out a research request form.

Friends of Omaha Public Library (FOPL)

The Friends of Omaha Public Library (FOPL) is a non-profit, volunteer-run organization which helps to fund literacy and community outreach programs for Omaha Public Library and the Omaha community. FOPL raises money through membership support and sales of used books.  General book sales are held quarterly at the W. Clarke Swanson Branch.  The Friends of Omaha Public Library can also be found online on AbeBooks as the Omaha Library Friends and on eBay as the Friends of the Omaha Public Library.

See also
 History of Omaha

References

External links
 Omaha Public Library official website.
 Friends of the Omaha Public Library
Director Gary Wasdin on Omaha.net
Nebraska Library Commission website

 
Government of Omaha, Nebraska
Public libraries in Nebraska
1872 establishments in Nebraska